SRAW may refer to:

 Canon sRAW, digital camera "small RAW" file format introduced on the Canon EOS 40D camera
 FGM-172 SRAW Short-Range Assault Weapon
 Specific airway resistance (sRaw)